A list of films produced in the United Kingdom in 1977 (see 1977 in film):

1977

See also
1977 in British music
1977 in British radio
1977 in British television
1977 in the United Kingdom

References

External links

1977
Films
Lists of 1977 films by country or language